Benjamín "Bengie" Cintrón Lebrón was a Puerto Rican politician and former mayor of Patillas. Cintrón was affiliated with the New Progressive Party (PNP) and served as mayor from 2001 to 2013.

In 2011, Cintrón was investigated by the Department of Justice of Puerto Rico for allegedly misusing public funds. The complaints to Justice were presented by members of the Municipal Assembly of Patillas, who felt that Cintrón wasn't allowed to use certain funds to celebrate the patron saint festival. Later that year, the Evaluating Committee of the New Progressive Party disqualified Cintrón from running in the upcoming elections. The committee cited the investigation by Justice, as well as another investigation for sexual harassment, as the reasons to disqualify Cintrón.

Cintrón appealed the decision and was allowed to run in the 2012 primaries. However, he was defeated by Cristóbal Colón Ruiz.

Benjamín Cintrón Lebrón died on May 4, 2022.

References

1952 births
2022 deaths
Mayors of places in Puerto Rico
New Progressive Party (Puerto Rico) politicians
People from Patillas, Puerto Rico